Think Fast! Records is an American independent hardcore punk record label. The label has hosted a number of influential acts, and is notable for being involved in the Trustkill Records imbroglio, having appointed Trustkill Records as worldwide distributor.

Notable bands
 Bullet Treatment
 Earth Crisis
 The Geeks
 Have Heart
 Ignite
 Only Crime
 Only Living Witness
 Outbreak
 Police Beat
 Re:Ignition
 Sick of It All
 This Is Hell
 Turning Point
 Until the End
 Where Fear and Weapons Meet
 Youth Attack

References

External links

Hardcore record labels
American independent record labels